Michaelina "Mikey" Argy  (born 1962) is an English thalidomide survivor and activist. She is a past chair of the National Advisory Committee of the Thalidomide Trust, the organisation through which British thalidomide survivors receive financial support, and is still involved in the media activities of the trust.

Life
She attended Michael Hall, a Steiner school in Ashdown Forest, Sussex. She has two daughters.

She stood as a candidate for the Independence from Europe party in the 2015 European Parliament election in South East England, but was not elected.

Honours
She was appointed MBE in the 2015 Birthday Honours. She was described as "Campaigner and Member, National Advisory Council, Thalidomide Trust", and the honour was "For services to Thalidomide Survivors".

References

1962 births
Living people
British health activists
People with phocomelia
People from East Sussex
English women activists
Members of the Order of the British Empire
Date of birth missing (living people)